Marta Natalia Filomena "Marina" Cisternas Holley (5 May 1897 – 26 January 1992) was a Chilean American actress, author, and journalist.  She became active as a journalist in Hollywood and in the Hollywood Foreign Press Association (HFPA). She is credited with helping design the Golden Globe trophy. She was the leading Spanish language columnist in Hollywood.

Cisternas was the daughter of Eliseo Cisternas, late Chief Justice of Chile. Her maternal grandfather was Adolfo Holley, a Chilean general who served in the War of the Pacific.

She was president of the HFPA from 1945 to 1946. She was engaged to Harold Lloyd Jr. She influenced Vincent Price's art collecting.

Bibliography
Andina (1949)
Forever Damned, Vantage Press (1955), a novel of historical fiction set in Chile

References

1897 births
American people of Chilean descent
20th-century American actresses
20th-century American novelists
20th-century American women writers
20th-century American journalists
1992 deaths